Odbojkaški klub Vojvodina is a professional volleyball team based in Novi Sad, Serbia. It plays in the Wiener Städtische League.

Honours and achievements
National Championships – 19
Champion of Yugoslavia (2):
1987–88, 1988–89
 Runners up (5): 1980/81, 1982/83, 1985/86, 1986/87, 1990/91
Champion of Serbia and Montenegro (10):
1991–92, 1992–93, 1993–94, 1994–95, 1995–96, 1996–97, 1997–98, 1998–99, 1999-00, 2003–04
 Runners up (3): 2001/02, 2004/05, 2005/06
Champion of Serbia (7):
2006–07, 2016/17, 2017/18, 2018/19, 2019/20, 2020/21, 2021/22
 Runners up (5): 2008/09, 2010/11, 2011/12, 2013/14, 2015/16

National Cups – 15
Yugoslav Cup (2):
1977, 1987
 Runners up (5): 1981, 1986, 1988, 1990, 1991
Serbia and Montenegro Cup (8):
1991/92, 1993/94, 1994/95, 1995/96, 1997/98, 2002/03, 2003/04, 2004/05
 Runners up (2): 1992/93, 2000/01
Serbian cup (5):
2006/07, 2009/10, 2011/12, 2014/15, 2019/20
 Runners up (1): 2016/17

National Super Cups – 5
Serbia and Montenegro Super cup (1):
1993
Serbian Super cup (4):
2015, 2019, 2020, 2021
 Runners up (3): 2012, 2017, 2018

International

CEV Champions League:
Bronze medal (x2): 1988/89, 1995/96
CEV Cup:
Semi finalist (x2) Bronze medal (x1): 1982/83, 2005/06
CEV Challenge Cup:
Winner (x1): 2014/15

Team roster–season 2019/2020

Coach: Siniša Gavrančić 

More notable players

Borislav Otić
Vojislav Nikolajević
Miomir Đurić
Milan Basarić
Petar Bilanić
Petar Kulešević
Branko Gvozdenović
Predrag Mihić
Slobodan Janjetović
Zlatoje Vasilijević
Aleksandar Milovanović
Nikola Marić
Mihal Potran
Slobodan Galešev
Branislav Terzin
Simo Višekruna
Dragan Nišić
Predrag Suša
Slavko Bogdan
Predrag Maoduš
Danilo Bijelić
Žarko Petrović
Radovan Dabić
Uroš Ribarić
Milan Marić
Velibor Ivanović
Pero Stanić
Dragan Klašnić 
Branislav Dobrodolski 
Zoran Nikolić 
Slobodan Košutić 
Đuro Bašić
Dragan Vermezović
Vladimir Grbić 
Slobodan Kovač 
Ekrem Lagumdžija
Strahinja Kozić
Nikola Salatić  
Siniša Reljić
Nikola Grbić
Đula Mešter 
Vasa Mijić 
Đorđe Đurić 
Dragan Svetozarević
Edin Škorić
Andrija Gerić 
Slobodan Boškan
Vladimir Batez
Marko Podraščanin
Marko Ivović
Dušan Tojagić
Konstantin Čupković
Branislav Đurić
Goran Ćato
Goran Marić
Miloš Vemić
Borislav Petrović
Marko Samardžić
Branko Roljić
Dražen Luburić
Gabrijel Radić
Veljko Petković
Dejan Bojović
Aleksandar Minić
Nikola Jovović
Milan Katić  
Petar Čurović
Goran Škundrić
Petar Premović 
David Mehić
Stefan Basta
Miran Kujundžić 
Stevan Simić
Čedomir Stanković
Nikola Peković 
Vukašin Todorović
Luka Čubrilo
Milan Jurišić
Danilo Mirosavljević 
Milija Mrdak
Nenad Simeunović
Nemanja Čubrilo
Stefan Kovačević
Aleksandar Veselinović
Pavle Perić
Nedjeljko Radović
Božidar Vučićević
Lazar Ilinčić
Milorad Kapur
Notable former coaches
Nebojša Ninkov
Darko Kalajdžić
Dušan Višekruna
Leszek Dorosz
Zoran Gajić
Nikola Salatić
Radovan Dabić
Milorad Kijac
Strahinja Kozić
Nedžad Osmankač

External links
 Official website

Serbian volleyball clubs
Sport in Novi Sad
SD Vojvodina
Volleyball clubs established in 1946
1946 establishments in Yugoslavia